Allodapula is a genus of bees in the family Apidae, subfamily Xylocopinae. They are similar in appearance, around 7mm in length, with swarthy head and thorax, contrasting with the brown abdomen. After the removal of a number of former species into other genera, the genus as presently defined occurs only in Africa.

Biology

The nest is inside a hollow weed or shrub stalk, and the tip of the abdomen is used to close off the nest entrance. A set of eggs are laid inside the plant stalk, in quick succession, so as to hatch together. They are placed at about the same height, above the bottom of the nest. The larvae are fed on pollen, which like other bees, is carried on hairs of the hind pair of legs. The larvae are mostly fed progressively, but being clumped together, they feed on a common food mass.

Species
Allodapula acutigera Cockerell, 1936
Allodapula brunnescens (Cockerell, 1934)
Allodapula dichroa (Strand, 1915)
Allodapula empeyi Michener, 1975
Allodapula guillarmodi Michener, 1970
Allodapula hessei Michener, 1971
Allodapula jucunda (Smith, 1879)
Allodapula maculithorax Michener, 1971
Allodapula melanopus (Cameron, 1905)
Allodapula monticola (Cockerell, 1933)
Allodapula ornaticeps Michener, 1971
Allodapula palliceps (Friese, 1924)
Allodapula rozeni Michener, 1975
Allodapula turneri (Cockerell, 1934)
Allodapula variegata (Smith, 1854)
Allodapula xerica Michener, 1971

Notes

Xylocopinae
Bee genera
Taxa named by Theodore Dru Alison Cockerell